World Press Cartoon is an independent organization based in Lisbon, Portugal. Founded in 2005 the organization is known for holding one of the world's largest and most prestigious annual press cartoon contests. World Press Cartoon has also organized separate exhibitions under thematic criteria, as gender violence or environment protection. In 2018 World Press Cartoon had its 13th edition.

From 2017, the awards ceremony is held in the Caldas da Rainha. After the contest, the prizewinning cartoons are assembled into a traveling exhibition that was already presented in Spain, France, Belgium, Mozambique, Brazil, Serbia, Croatia, Slovenia, Bulgaria, Romania, Mexico, United Kingdom, China and India. A catalogue presenting all the prizewinning entries is published annually in English and Portuguese.

Another primary objective of the organization is to support professional cartoonists on a wide international scale, with a special focus in the freedom of the press.

https://upload.wikimedia.org/wikipedia/commons/7/7f/LOGO_WPC_VER.jpg

2022 winners

Editorial Cartoon 
 1st - Terror, Colombia
 2nd - Boligán, México

Gag Cartoon 
 1st - T.V., Cuba
 2nd - Victor Solis @visoor , México, publicado en EFEverde.com
 2nd - Hontouris, Grecia

Caricature 
 1st - [Matias], Argentina
 2nd - [Frank Hoppmann], Alemania
 3rd - J. Aldeguer, España

2018 winners

Caricature 
 1st - Luc Descheemaeker, Belgium
 2nd - Peter Nieuwendijk, Netherlands
 3rd - Thomas Antony, India

Honourable mentions
 Ali Husain Al Sumaikh, Bahrain
 Cau Gomez, Brazil
 Mário Alberto, Brazil
 Vasco Gargalo, Portugal
 Pedro J. Molina, Nicaragua

Gag Cartoon 
 1st - Nedeljko Ubovic, Serbia
 2nd - Silvano Mello, Brazil
 3rd - Fadi Abou Hassan, Norway

Honourable mentions
 Osmani Simanca, Brazil
 Angel Boligán, Mexico
 Mojmir Mihatov, Croatia

Editorial Cartoon 
 1st - Marilena Nardi, Italy
 2nd - Cau Gomez, Brazil
 3rd - Hicabi Demirc Turkey

Honourable mentions
 Ali Husain Al Sumaikh, Bahrain
 Yaser Alahmad, Turkey 
 Agim Sulaj, Albania
 Norio Yamanoi, Cuba
 Shahram Rezaei Iran

Grand Prix World Press Cartoon 2018 
 Marilena Nardi, Italy

2017 winners

Caricature 
 1st - Luiz Carlos Fernandes, Brazil, Diário do Grande ABC
 2nd - Eduardo Baptistão, Brazil, Veja 
 3rd - Mariagrazia Quaranta, Italy, L’Unità

Honourable mentions
 Agustín Sciamarella,	Italy, El Pais
 Shankar Pamarthy, India, Sakshi Daily
 Cau Gomez, Brazil, A Tarde

Gag Cartoon 
 1st - Toshow Borkovic, Serbia, Ilustrovarna Politika 
 2nd - Silvan Wegmann, Switzerland, Schweiz am Sonntag
 3rd - Xavier Bonilla, Ecuador, Nuestro Mundo

Honourable mentions
 Rousso, France, Zelim
 Trayko Popov, Bulgaria, Cartoon Art
 Silvano Mello, Brazil, O Trem Itabirano

Editorial Cartoon 
 1st - Alireza Pakdel, Iran, Etemad
 2nd -Michael Kountouris, Greece, Efimerida Ton Syntakton
 3rd - Constantin Sunnerberg France, Courrier International

Honourable mentions
 Eric van der Wal, 	Netherlands	De Telegraaf
 Nahid Zamani,  	Iran 	Esfahanenimrooz 
 Marco de Angelis, Italy, Buduar
 António Jorge Gonçalves, India, Gulf News

Grand Prix World Press Cartoon 2017 
 Alireza Pakdel, Iran, Etemad

2015 winners

Caricature 
 1st - Cau Gomez, Brazil, A Tarde
 2nd - Dalcio Machado, Brazil, Correio Popular
 3rd - Riber Hansson, Sweden, Courrier International

Honourable mentions
 Santiagu, Portugal, Em Contexto
 Yaser Khanbaray, Iran, Zhyar Magazin
 Ilian Savkov, Bulgaria, Standart
 Bruce MacKinnon, Canada, The Chronicle Herald

Gag Cartoon 
 1st - Michael Kountouris, Greece, Shedia
 2nd - Angel Boligán, Mexico, Conozca
 3rd - Mohammad Ali Khalaji, Iran, Jam-e-Jam

Honourable mentions
 Cost, France, Courrier International
 Trayko Popov, Bulgaria, Duma
 Marilena Nardi, Italia, Barricate
 Vladimir Stankovsky, Serbia, Vreme

Editorial Cartoon 
 1st - André Carrilho, Portugal, Diário de Notícias
 2nd - Nikolov Tchavdar, Bulgaria, Pressa Daily
 3rd - Cost, France, Kpaiha

Honourable mentions
 Michael Kountouris, Greece, Efimerida Ton Syntakton
 William Rasoanaivo, Madagascar, L'Éxpress
 Burkh Fritsche, Germany, Die Tageszeitung
 Angel Boligán, Mexico, El Universal
 Ramachandra Babu, India, Gulf News
 Cau Gomez, Brasil. A Tarde
 Contraste, Cristina Sampaio, Portugal, Africa 21

Grand Prix World Press Cartoon 2015 
 André Carrilho, Portugal, Diário de Notícias

References 
 
 http://www.euronews.com/2017/06/14/world-press-cartoon-awards-top-prize-to-iranian-artist

External links
 http://www.euronews.com/2017/06/14/world-press-cartoon-awards-top-prize-to-iranian-artist
 https://www.efeverde.com/noticias/world-press-cartoon-premia-una-vineta-ambiental-del-mexicano-victor-solis-visoor-en-efeverde/

Cultural organisations based in Portugal
Cartooning events
2005 establishments in Portugal